is a Japanese manga series written and illustrated by Makoto Ojiro. It has been serialized in Shogakukan's seinen manga magazine Weekly Big Comic Spirits since May 2019. An anime television series adaptation by Liden Films is set to premiere in April 2023. A live-action film adaptation is set to premiere in June 2023.

Plot
In the small city of Nanao, insomniac Ganta Nakami tries to catch a nap in his school's abandoned astronomical observatory. There he stumbles upon a sociable and carefree girl named Isaki Magari who has the same problem. The two form an awkward friendship and reestablish their school's defunct astronomy club.

Characters

Media

Manga
Shogakukan collected its chapters into individual tankōbon volumes. The first volume was released on September 12, 2019. As of January 12, 2023, eleven volumes have been released.

In June 2022, Viz Media announced that they licensed the series for English publication.

Volume list

Anime
In January 2022, an anime television series adaptation was announced. The series is produced by Liden Films and directed by Yūki Ikeda, with scripts written by Rintarō Ikeda, character designs handled by Yuki Fukuda, and music composed by Yuki Hayashi. It is set to premiere on April 11, 2023, on TV Tokyo and other channels. Sentai Filmworks licensed the series, and will be streaming it on Hidive.

Film
In January 2022, a live-action film adaptation was announced. The film is directed by Chihiro Ikeda, produced by United Productions, and distributed by Pony Canyon. The film will premiere on June 23, 2023.

Other media
The Japanese band  released a music video for their single , which featured art from the manga, on November 21, 2019.

Reception
Insomniacs After School won the Mandō Kobayashi Manga Grand Prix 2023, created by comedian and manga enthusiast Kendo Kobayashi.

See also
 Neko no Otera no Chion-san, another manga series by the same author

Notes

References

External links
 
 

2023 anime television series debuts
Anime series based on manga
Drama anime and manga
Films set in Ishikawa Prefecture
Liden Films
Manga adapted into films
Nanao, Ishikawa
Romance anime and manga
School life in anime and manga
Seinen manga
Sentai Filmworks
Shogakukan manga
Sleep disorders in fiction
Television shows set in Ishikawa Prefecture
Upcoming anime television series
Viz Media manga